Immortal Souls is a melodic death metal band from Kokkola, Finland, formed in 1991. They released a split album and their debut on Little Rose Productions in the late 1990s and early 2000s. In 2002, Immortal Souls signed with Dutch label Fear Dark which released their second and third album as well as a compilation. They have performed at Tuska Open Air Metal Festival. Their musical style is characterized by their use of melodic guitar riffs and singing which shifts between growls and shouting. Their music has been called winter metal since Immortal Souls utilizes frosty metaphors in their lyrics and usually creates a cold, wintry atmosphere. The album Wintereich was released in 2007 in Europe on Dark Balance and in the USA through Facedown Records.

History

Beginning
In December 1991, Aki Särkioja (bass guitar, vocals) and Esa Särkioja (guitar) founded Immortal Souls. During the years 1992-1994 Immortal Souls recorded some demo tapes including a tape called Vision of Hell (1993). These demos have never been officially published. In 1994, the drummer Antti Nykyri joined the band. At the end of January 1995 the band recorded a demo tape called Immortal Souls, which included six songs. 100 copies were made of the demo tape and it contained straightforward heavy metal with growl vocals. After the Immortal Souls demo, all of the band's album covers have had a wintry theme in the artwork. Nykyri left the band after one year due to other personal interests.

Doom metal period
During the years 1995-1996 Immortal Souls wrote new songs and shaped their musical style. At the time, the band members were interested in doom metal, and with that influence they recorded a demo called Reflections of Doom in November 1996. In the recording sessions Immortal Souls had to use a drum machine, because a new drummer Jupe Hakola was signed in a couple of months after the recording sessions. The song “Hate Sender” was published in the TOB zine's 7- inch vinyl record. The song “I`am Me” was published later on the From Kaamos To Midnight Sun compilation album. Also songs "Hate Sender", "I am Me" and "Realm of Hatred" were later published on the Once Upon A Time In The North compilation album as remastered versions.

Record deal with Little Rose

After the release of the demo tapes, Immortal Souls signed a record deal with a Finnish record label called Little Rose Productions. At that time the band had already left behind the doom metal influences and their musical style had changed to fast, melodic death metal and the winter theme in the lyrics had settled as a regular. Their first recording with the new style was Divine Wintertime EP, released in 1998. It was published as a split-CD with the fellow Finnish metal band, Mordecai (Through the Woods, Towards the Dawn). This publication got a lot of appreciation among the metal fans and the song “Snow Soul” became one of the most top-rated Immortal Souls song.
 
Growing numbers of concerts required additional members to join the line-up. In 2000, Pete Loisa (rhythm guitar) joined the group when the band was preparing to record their first full-length studio album. From the material of the February 2000 studio sessions at the Studio Watercastle was first published the Cleansing EP which gave a  taster of the forthcoming album. The debut album Under the Northern Sky was released in 2001. At that time Little Rose Productions was closing their operation, and therefore the band started to search for another publisher.

Record deal with Fear Dark

Immortal Souls had already connections (as a distributor) to the record label called Fear Dark from Netherlands, and therefore the deal was easy to make for both the band and for the record company. After signing the deal, the band embarked on a Central European tour. They also became a regular performer in the record label's annual Fear Dark Fest events. After the tour Immortal Souls started to write new material and in November 2002 they went to Studio Sonic Pump to record the next album called Ice Upon the Night. This album made the band more known also in Finland and it opened the opportunity to perform in the Tuska Open Air metal festival in Helsinki. This album was licensed to the US and Canada by the Facedown Records in the year 2004.

The band performed occasionally through the year. The drummer Jupe Hakola decided to leave the band and he was replaced by Jukka-Pekka Koivisto. But Jukka-Pekka Koivisto had to leave the band after a tour of Germany and Switzerland because he was busy with his other band Silent Voices new album recordings. The band found a new drummer from their circle of friends in early 2005, when Juha Kronqvist joined Immortal Souls. 
Because the Immortal Souls recordings had been long sold out, Fear Dark decided to publish them as remastered versions on the Once Upon A Time In The North 2 CD compilation album at the end of 2005. At the label's request, Aki Särkioja wrote the publication history into the CD liner notes.

Wintereich and The Requiem for the Art of Death
The band started to write new material and played occasional concerts at the same time. In 2006, Immortal Souls announced on their website that they were working on a storybased concept album, which was to be called Wintereich. The band went to the studio in December 2006. The album was mastered in the first quarter of 2007. The new label Dark Balance based released Wintereich on June 1, 2007. Like the album Ice Upon The Night in 2004, Wintereich has been distributed by Facedown Records and was released in the U.S. on August 21, 2007.

On May 22, it was announced that the band was working on an album titled The Requiem for the Art of Death. The album was released on October 7, 2011.

Record Deal With Rottwelier Records
On March 24, 2015, Immortal Souls released their newest album, Wintermetal, via Rottweiler Records.

Music
Immortal Souls' music is typically fast, technical melodic death metal of Scandinavian school. The lead guitar solos sets as a part of the accompaniment in both singing and virtuoso riffs and fast playing techniques. Riffs, tones and licks are melodic and stick to classical harmonies. The lead guitarist Esa Särkioja usually performs "darkly melodic riffage with power metal undercurrents".

Discography
Demos
 Immortal Souls (1995)
 Reflections of Doom (1997)
EPs
 Divine Wintertime/Through the Woods, Towards the Dawn (1998; Split EP with Mordecai)
 The Cleansing EP (2000)
Compilations
 Once Upon a Time in the North (2005)
Studio albums
 Under the Northern Sky (2001)
 Ice Upon the Night (2003)
 Ice Upon the Night - US Version (2004)
 Wintereich (2007)
 IV: The Requiem for the Art of Death (2011)
 Wintermetal (2015)
Compilation appearances
 From Kaamos To Midnight Sun (1998)
 The Cold Northwind (2001)
 Metal + Hardcore Sampler CD (2003)
 Hard Music Sampler (2004)
 Sampler 2004 Facedown Distribution (2004)
 Extreme Music Sampler Volume 6 (2004)
 Something Worth Fighting For (2007)
 Facedown Records Sampler (2007)
 Thorns, Horns & Barbwire (2008)
 Repossession: A Christmas Album (2014)
 United We Skate Benefit Comp - Vol. 5 Metal (2015)
 Meltdown Echoes of Eternity (2016)
 The Bearded Dragon's Sampler: Third Times a Charm (2017)
 Extreme Music Sampler Volume 1

Members
Current members
 Aki Särkioja – vocals, bass guitar (1991–present)
 Esa Särkioja – lead guitar (1991–present)
 Marko Pekkarinen – rhythm guitar (2011–present)
 Juha Kronqvist – drums (2005–present)

Former members
 Antti Nykyri – drums (1994–1995)
 Jupe Hakola – drums (1996–2004)
 Jukka-Pekka Koivisto – drums (2005)
 Pete Loisa – rhythm guitar (2000–2010)

Timeline

References

External links
 

Finnish Christian metal musical groups
Finnish melodic death metal musical groups
Musical groups established in 1991
Musical quartets
Rottweiler Records artists
1991 establishments in Finland